Eumonhystera is a genus of nematodes belonging to the family Monhysteridae.

The species of this genus are found in Europe and Northern America.

Species:
 Eumonhystera abyssalis Gagarin & Naumova, 2010 
 Eumonhystera alpina (Filipjev, 1918)

References

Nematodes